Diemer is a surname. Notable people with the surname include:

Brian Diemer (born 1961), American middle distance runner
Emil Josef Diemer (1908–1990), German chess player
Emma Lou Diemer (born 1927), American composer
Franz-Zeno Diemer (1889–1954), German aviator
Hugo Diemer (1870–1937), American engineer, consultant, professor, and management author
Johann Heinrich Diemer (1904–1945), Dutch biologist
Kurt Diemer (1893–1953), German footballer
Louis Diémer (1843–1919), French classical pianist and composer
Marv Diemer (1924–2013), American politician and businessman
Walter Diemer (1904–1998), American inventor

German-language surnames